The 2021 Africa Cup of Nations qualification matches were organized by the Confederation of African Football (CAF) to decide the participating teams of the 2021 Africa Cup of Nations, the 33rd edition of the international men's football championship of Africa. A total of 24 teams qualified to play in the final tournament, including Cameroon who qualified automatically as hosts.

Draw
The draw took place on 18 July 2019, 18:30 CAT (UTC+2), in Cairo, Egypt. A total of 52 teams entered the tournament, including the hosts Cameroon, while Eritrea and Somalia chose to not enter the qualifiers.

Seeding
The teams were seeded based upon their June 2019 FIFA World Rankings (ranking shown in parentheses). All 44 teams from Pot 1 to Pot 4 entered the competition at the group stage, while teams from Pot 5 had to compete at the preliminary round in order to advance to the group stage.

Each group contained one team from Pot 1, 2 and 3. Groups from A to D contained a winning team from the preliminary round, while groups from E to L contained a team from Pot 4. Teams in bold qualified for the final tournament.

Schedule
The schedule of the qualifying competition was as follows. After the rescheduling of the final tournament from June/July to January/February, the dates of matchdays 3–6 of the group stage were also rescheduled.

Due to the COVID-19 pandemic, all matches of matchdays 3 and 4 scheduled for March 2020 were postponed until further notice. FIFA recommended that all June 2020 international matches (matchday 5) be postponed, and also postponed the September 2020 window (matchday 6) for CAF.

On 30 June 2020, the CAF announced the 2021 Africa Cup of Nations final tournament had been postponed from January 2021 to January 2022, without announcing the new dates of the remaining qualifiers. On 19 August 2020, CAF announced the second revised dates for both Africa Cup of Nations and FIFA World Cup qualifiers.

Preliminary round

All eight teams from Pot 5 were drawn into four ties and played in home-and-away two-legged format. The four winners advanced to the group stage to join the 44 teams which entered directly. They went to positions A4, B4, C4 and D4 respectively based on their tie number.

Group stage
The 48 teams were drawn into twelve groups of four teams (from Group A to Group L). Teams consisted of the 44 teams which entered directly, in addition to the four winners of the preliminary round whose identity was not known at the time of the draw.

The 2021 Africa Cup of Nations hosts, Cameroon, participated in the qualifiers with the team guaranteed a spot in the finals regardless of its ranking in the group. Their matches and results counted in determining the qualification of the other teams from their group. If Cameroon had finished out of top two teams in their group, a group runner-up would not have qualified for the main tournament.

Tiebreakers
The teams were ranked according to points (3 points for a win, 1 point for a draw, 0 points for a loss). If tied on points, tiebreakers were applied in the following order (Regulations Article 14):
Points in head-to-head matches among tied teams;
Goal difference in head-to-head matches among tied teams;
Goals scored in head-to-head matches among tied teams;
Away goals scored in head-to-head matches among tied teams;
If more than two teams were tied, and after applying all head-to-head criteria above, a subset of teams were still tied, all head-to-head criteria above were reapplied exclusively to this subset of teams;
Goal difference in all group matches;
Goals scored in all group matches;
Away goals scored in all group matches;
Drawing of lots.

Group A

Group B

Group C

Group D

Group E

Group F

Group G

Group H

Group I

Group J

Group K

Group L

Qualified teams
The following teams qualified for the final tournament.

 
1 Bold indicates champions for that year. Italics indicates hosts for that year.

Goalscorers

References

 
2021
Qualification
2019 in African football
2020 in African football
October 2019 sports events in Africa
November 2019 sports events in Africa
November 2020 sports events in Africa
March 2021 sports events in Africa
Association football events postponed due to the COVID-19 pandemic